Baruzh (also Romanized as Bārūzh) is a village in Baranduzchay-ye Jonubi Rural District, in the Central District of Urmia County, West Azerbaijan Province, Iran. At the 2006 census, its population was 148, in 28 families.

References 

Populated places in Urmia County